Matikonis Peak is a small, rather isolated rock peak that protrudes through the snow mantle of the central Coulter Heights, near the coast of Marie Byrd Land, Antarctica. It was mapped by the United States Geological Survey from surveys and U.S. Navy air photos, 1959–65, and was named by the Advisory Committee on Antarctic Names for William P. Matikonis, U.S. Navy, a damage controlman aboard , 1961–62.

References

Mountains of Marie Byrd Land